Andre Clintonian Coleman (born September 19, 1972) is an American football coach and former player.  He played professionally for five seasons as a wide receiver in the National Football League (NFL) with the San Diego Chargers, the Pittsburgh Steelers, and the Seattle Seahawks.  Coleman attended Hickory High School in Hermitage, Pennsylvania, playing on the AAA state championship team.  He played College football at Kansas State University.

Coleman's primary role during his career was as a kick returner, gaining 4,466 yards and two touchdowns returning kickoffs.  He also added 384 yards and a touchdown returning punts, and caught 43 passes for 602 yards and three touchdowns.  As a rookie, Coleman played in Super Bowl XXIX with the Chargers and set several Super Bowl records in the game:  most kickoff returns (8), most return yards (244), and most total yards (244).  Coleman had a 98-yard kickoff return for a touchdown in the game, tied for the second longest kickoff return in Super Bowl history.

In 2011 and 2012, Coleman coached at Youngstown State University. Coleman held the position of wide receivers coach at Kansas State for five years before being promoted to offensive coordinator on January 24, 2018. In February 2019, Coleman announced that he would be joining coaching staff at the University of Texas at Austin as an analyst. On January 13, 2020, Coleman was announced as the new wide receivers coach for the Longhorns.

References

External links
 Kansas State profile
 

1972 births
Living people
American football return specialists
American football wide receivers
Kansas State Wildcats football coaches
Kansas State Wildcats football players
Pittsburgh Steelers players
San Diego Chargers players
Seattle Seahawks players
Texas Longhorns football coaches
Youngstown State Penguins football coaches
Sportspeople from Charlotte, North Carolina
People from Hermitage, Pennsylvania
Players of American football from Pennsylvania
Players of American football from Charlotte, North Carolina